The Inkigayo Chart is a music program record chart that gives an award to the best-performing single of the week in South Korea. Up until February 1, the chart measured digital performance in domestic online music services (60%), social media via YouTube views (35%), advanced viewer votes (10%), and album sales (5%) in its ranking methodology. The candidates for the number-one song of the week received additional points from live votes. Beginning on February 8, Inkigayo implemented modifications for its measurements of digital performance (down to 55%) and added album sales (5%).

In 2015, there were 34 singles that ranked number one on the chart and 23 music acts received award trophies for this feat. Five songs collected trophies for three weeks and earned a Triple Crown: Exo's "Call Me Baby", Big Bang's "Loser", Girls' Generation's "Lion Heart", Taeyeon's "I", and Psy's "Daddy". Girl group EXID won its first Inkigayo award with "Up & Down" upon the song's sudden rise in popularity. Rapper Mad Clown received his first win on the program with "Fire". Other first-time Inkigayo winners as soloists include Jonghyun's "Déjà-Boo", Jung Yong-hwa's "One Fine Day", Naul's "You from the Same Time", Taeyeon's "I", and Zico's "Boys and Girls". On the August 23 broadcast, "Let's Not Fall in Love" by Big Bang accumulated a perfect score of 11,000 points.

Chart history

References 

2015 in South Korean music
2015 record charts
Lists of number-one songs in South Korea